Linaria triornithophora, commonly known as three bird toadflax, is a perennial plant in the family Plantaginaceae.

References

triornithophora